Bruzual is a surname. Notable people with the surname include:

Eleonora Bruzual, Venezuelan writer and journalist
Manuel Ezequiel Bruzual (1830–1868), Venezuelan military leader and president